Joseph Bartenfelder is an American politician and farmer from Maryland. He was appointed Secretary of Agriculture for Maryland by then-Governor-elect Larry Hogan in 2014.

Education 
Bartenfelder graduated from St. Joseph School and Calvert Hall College High School. He earned a degree in business administration from Towson University.

Career 
In 1978, Bartenfelder ran for the Maryland House of Delegates for the first time. In 1982, he won his first state delegate seat and represented District 8 in the house until 1994.

In 1994, Bartenfelder began working on the Baltimore County Council. In 1996, he became chairman of the Baltimore County Council. He also served as chair of the Spending and Affordability Committee for four years while on the County Council.

In 2010, he ran in the primary to be Baltimore County Executive, which he lost to Kevin Kamenetz. 

Bartenfelder was appointed Maryland Secretary of Agriculture by then-Governor-elect Larry Hogan in 2014.

Personal life 
Bartenfelder is married and has four children. On Thanksgiving, November 24, 2022, police charged him with hunting wetland or upland game birds “with the aid of bait or on or over any baited area,” which carries a minimum $500 fine and a maximum of $1500 for a first offense. Lauren Moses, public information officer for Natural Resources Police, could not say whether this was Bartenfelder’s first charge.

References 

1957 births
Living people
Politicians from Baltimore
State cabinet secretaries of Maryland
Maryland Department of Agriculture
Maryland Democrats
County commissioners in Maryland